Pseudonocardia antitumoralis is a bacterium from the genus of Pseudonocardia which has been isolated from deep-sea sediments from the South China Sea. Pseudonocardia antitumoralis produces deoxynyboquinone, pseudonocardian A, pseudonocardian B, and pseudonocardian C.

References

Pseudonocardia
Bacteria described in 2013